The Dos Touros River is a river of Rio Grande do Sul state in southern Brazil. Astyanax taurorum is a species of fish found in the river.

See also
List of rivers of Rio Grande do Sul

References

Rivers of Rio Grande do Sul